3564 Talthybius  is a large Jupiter trojan from the Greek camp, approximately  in diameter. It was discovered on 15 October 1985, by American astronomer Edward Bowell at the Anderson Mesa Station near Flagstaff, Arizona, in the United States. The dark D-type asteroid belongs to the 50 largest Jupiter trojans and has a relatively long rotation period of 40.59 hours. It was named after the Greek hero Talthybius, who was a herald during the Trojan War.

Orbit and classification 

Talthybius is a dark Jovian asteroid orbiting in the leading Greek camp at Jupiter's  Lagrangian point, 60° ahead its orbit in a 1:1 resonance (see Trojans in astronomy). It is also a non-family asteroid in the Jovian background population.

It orbits the Sun at a distance of 5.0–5.4 AU once every 11 years and 10 months (4,334 days; semi-major axis of 5.2 AU). Its orbit has an eccentricity of 0.04 and an inclination of 16° with respect to the ecliptic. The body's observation arc begins with a precovery at Palomar Observatory in December 1950, almost 35 years prior to its official discovery observation at Anderson Mesa.

Physical characteristics 

In the SDSS-based taxonomy, Talthybius is dark D-type asteroid. Pan-STARRS's survey also characterized it as a D-type, while the Collaborative Asteroid Lightcurve Link (CALL) assumed it to be of a carbonaceous C-type composition.

Rotation period 

In June 1994, a rotational lightcurve of Talthybius was obtained by Stefano Mottola and Anders Erikson using the Bochum 0.61-metre Telescope at La Silla Observatory in Chile. Lightcurve analysis gave a rotation period of 40.59 hours with a brightness variation of 0.38 magnitude.

Photometric observations by Robert Stephen at the Goat Mountain Astronomical Research Station  in November 2009 and at the Center for Solar System Studies in February 2015, gave two concurring periods of 40.40 and 40.44 hours with a corresponding amplitude of 0.31 and 0.38.

While not being a slow rotator, Talthybiuses period is significantly longer than that of most larger Jupiter trojans, which have a spin rate of typically 10 hours.

Diameter and albedo 

According to the surveys carried out by the Infrared Astronomical Satellite IRAS, the Japanese Akari satellite and the NEOWISE mission of NASA's Wide-field Infrared Survey Explorer, Talthybius measures between 68.92 and 74.11 kilometers in diameter and its surface has an albedo between 0.062 and 0.093. CALL derives an albedo of 0.0654 and a diameter of 68.53 kilometers based on an absolute magnitude of 9.4.

Naming 

This minor planet was named after the Greek hero Talthybius from Greek mythology, who was the chief herald during the Trojan War. The official naming citation was published by the Minor Planet Center on 5 November 1987.

Notes

References

External links 
 Asteroid Lightcurve Database (LCDB), query form (info )
 Dictionary of Minor Planet Names, Google books
 Discovery Circumstances: Numbered Minor Planets (1)-(5000) – Minor Planet Center
 
 

003564
Discoveries by Edward L. G. Bowell
Named minor planets
19851015